Bergius is a surname. Notable people with the surname include:

Friedrich Bergius (1884–1949), German chemist
Jere Bergius (born 1987), Finnish pole vaulter
Karl Heinrich Bergius (1790–1818), Prussian botanist, naturalist, cavalryman and pharmacist
Peter Jonas Bergius (1730–1790), Swedish botanist

See also
Bergius process, a method of production of liquid hydrocarbons
Berg (surname)

German-language surnames
Swedish-language surnames